Frederick Eugene Rakestraw (August 29, 1923 – August 18, 2004) was an American lawyer, politician, and judge who served as a justice of the Indiana Supreme Court from January 7, 1966 to January 2, 1967.

Biography
Rakestraw was born in Lima, Ohio to John Franklin and Hettie Rakestraw (née Driver).

Rakestraw attended public school in Lima. In high school, Rakestraw was a member of the Ohio state championship debate team.

Rakestraw attended Manchester University in North Manchester, Indiana, for two years before joining Army during the Second World War. He served as a member of Signal Corps in the European Theatre. After the war, Rakestraw received his LL.B. from the Indiana University Maurer School of Law in 1947. He was admitted to the bar in 1949.

After graduating, Rakestraw practiced law in Akron, Ohio, at the firm of William Deniston. He then moved back to Indiana, settling in Fulton County. In 1954, Rakestraw, a Democrat, was elected judge of the Fulton County Circuit Court. He was the first Democrat elected in the county in 18 years. He served in the position for 11 years.

Rakestraw became a justice of the Indiana Supreme Court in 1966, appointed by Governor Roger D. Branigin to succeed the resigning Justice Frederick Landis Jr. He left the court in 1967, succeeded by Justice Donald Mote.

After leaving the court, Rakestraw began practicing law in Plymouth before returning to Fulton County to practice law in Rochester.

Rakestraw was a member of the First Christian Church, a Disciples of Christ church in Rochester, where he served as an Elder, Board Chairman, and Sunday school teacher for 45 years. Rakestraw was also a member of the local Kiwanis Club for 45 years. Rakestraw also became a patron of his alma mater, Manchester University.

Rakestraw married Wilodean Weimer in 1943 in Wabash County. They had four children, two sons and two daughters.

Rakestraw died in 2004. The Fulton County Community Foundation gives out an annual scholarship named for Rakestraw.

References

1923 births
2004 deaths
People from Lima, Ohio
Manchester University (Indiana) alumni
Indiana University Maurer School of Law alumni
Justices of the Indiana Supreme Court
American judges
Indiana Democrats
American Disciples of Christ